Phoebe Jeter (born 1964 in Chester, South Carolina) is a United States Army retired Major noted for being the only woman and first male or female air defense artillery officer to lead a platoon that destroyed a SCUD missile fired against U.S. military forces during Operation Desert Storm.

Jeter attended the University of North Carolina Wilmington where she was commissioned a 2nd lieutenant. She led an all-male platoon during Desert Storm while assigned to D Battery, 3-43 (Patriot) ADA.

References
 
 1LT Jeter played by Angela Bassett
 Ebony - Google Books
 The Heroes of Desert Storm. 
 The Heroes of Desert Storm-The Movie
 Black Women's Military Contributions
 Internet Movie Database 
 Notable UNCW Alumni

1964 births
Living people
University of North Carolina at Wilmington alumni
United States Army officers
United States Army personnel of the Gulf War
Women in the United States Army